Breaking Up Is Easy to Do may refer to:

 "Breaking Up Is Easy to Do", a season 11 episode of Married... with Children
 "Breaking up is Easy to Do", a season 2 episode of Maths Mansion

See also
 "Breaking Up Is Hard to Do", a song recorded by Neil Sedaka